The Speaking Out movement is a social movement against emotional, physical and sexual abuse in the professional wrestling industry, where people publicize their allegations of misconduct committed by powerful and/or prominent individuals. Similar to other empowerment movements based upon breaking silence such as #MeToo, the purpose of #SpeakingOut (a hashtag that began to spread on Twitter in June 2020) is to empower wrestling-related people to tell their stories of abuse they have experienced.

History

On June 17, 2020, independent wrestler David Starr was accused of sexual assault by a former girlfriend of his, which Starr denied. After the allegation came out, several wrestling promotions stripped Starr of his titles and fired him.

The following day, numerous people in and out of the pro wrestling industry accused several wrestlers, promoters, personalities, and journalists of sexual misconduct. The hashtag "Speaking Out" began to spread on social media when people told their stories. #SpeakingOut was a trending topic on Twitter. Soon after, one of the victims making the accusations stated that Yorkshire Police were investigating the accusations and that she and another victim had a list of 70 wrestlers with 100 incidents documented.

Response
Many wrestlers, personalities, and journalists overwhelmingly supported those that spoke out on their experiences.

All Elite Wrestling
All Elite Wrestling wrestler Jimmy Havoc was accused of emotional and verbal abuse by former partner, Rebecca Crow. On June 19, 2020, AEW announced in a statement that Havoc would be attending therapy for a number of issues and they would come to a decision about his employment at a later date. Havoc would be released by AEW on August 13.

On June 22, audio from a podcast went viral where Sammy Guevara joked that he wanted to rape WWE women's wrestler Sasha Banks. AEW subsequently suspended Guevara without pay, with Guevara agreeing to undergo extensive sensitivity training. It was also announced that Guevara's salary would be donated to the Women's Center of Jacksonville. Later that day, Banks stated that she and Guevara had been in contact with each other, that he had apologized to her, and that they had engaged in an "open discussion" to help him understand the severity of his comments. Guevara would complete his training and return on July 22.

On June 23, Darby Allin was accused of emotional, mental, and sexual abuse by Hawlee Cromwell, an independent wrestler with whom he allegedly had a relationship.

Chikara
On June 19, Chikara removed Kobald from their roster following allegations made against him. Chikara owner Mike Quackenbush was also accused of knowingly overseeing a company that enabled abuse and neglect, which led to many wrestlers on the Chikara roster such as Hallowicked, Kimber Lee, Jacob Hammermeier, Frightmare and Green Ant resigning from the promotion. On June 24, Chikara announced they had shut down completely.

Impact Wrestling
Wrestlers Joey Ryan, Michael Elgin, and Dave Crist were accused of misconduct. Impact Wrestling's parent company, Anthem Sports & Entertainment, released a statement saying they were reviewing the allegations. Ryan, who had seventeen different allegations against him, would release a statement without addressing specific allegations. It was later revealed that Ryan and Crist's contracts were terminated, while Elgin was suspended. On June 26, Impact Wrestling announced Elgin would be removed from all future programing. On July 2, Elgin released a video denying the allegations made against him. On July 18, Ryan also released a video denying almost all the allegations made against him. He filed lawsuits against some of his accusers as well as a lawsuit against Impact. On March 8, 2021, Ryan issued a statement saying he would drop several lawsuits. Two days later, he issued a second statement saying he would drop another lawsuit.

TJP came out with allegations of being taken advantage of by older female wrestlers when he was fifteen.

Major League Wrestling
On June 20, Major League Wrestling ring announcer Mark Adam Haggerty was accused of sending inappropriate text messages to a minor. An hour later, MLW and two other promotions announced that they would no longer be working with Haggerty.

National Wrestling Alliance
On June 18, National Wrestling Alliance Vice President Dave Lagana was accused of sexual misconduct. The following day, Lagana resigned from his position.

New Japan Pro-Wrestling
New Japan Pro-Wrestling star Will Ospreay was accused by a former female wrestler, Pollyanna, of having her blacklisted after she made allegations towards another wrestler, Scott Wainwright, who is a friend of Ospreay's. While Ospreay denied the accusation, International Wrestling League would release a statement that contradicted his denial. In October 2020, IWL retracted their statement.

Ring of Honor
On June 22, Marty Scurll was accused of taking advantage of a 16-year-old girl who was inebriated. Scurll would release two statements in which he did not deny the allegations, but claimed the encounter was consensual while both participants were intoxicated. On June 25, Ring of Honor announced that they launched an investigation concerning the allegations. On January 4, 2021, it was announced that Scurll had left ROH.

On July 6, former ROH Women's Champion Kelly Klein alleged that Jay Lethal sexually harassed women and ROH covered it up. He had been previously accused by Taeler Hendrix of sexually harassing her in 2018. Lethal released a statement denying the allegations.

WWE

Joe Coffey was accused of harassing a woman, sending unsolicited naked photos, sending voice messages, and unsolicited stalking. On June 30, he was suspended by WWE.

Jack Gallagher was accused of sexual assault. On June 19, he was released by WWE. His profile was later deleted from WWE.com. On October 4, Gallagher issued a statement concerning the circumstances that led to his release.

Jordan Devlin was accused of physical abuse by a former partner. Devlin denied the allegations. He would be suspended indefinitely by Progress Wrestling following the allegations.

Matt Riddle was accused of sexual misconduct by a female wrestler. Riddle denied the allegation through his attorney. It was later reported that WWE was aware of the allegation against Riddle when he was signed in 2018 and had investigated it at the time. On July 8, Riddle admitted to having an affair with his accuser, but reiterated his denial of the accusations against him. On September 16, Riddle dropped his petition for a restraining order against his accuser. The following day, Riddle filed a civil lawsuit against his accuser. On October 8, it was reported that Riddle's accuser filed a countersuit against Riddle, WWE, Gabe Sapolsky, and Evolve Wrestling. On March 24, 2021, a judge ruled to terminate WWE and Gabe Sapolsky as defendants in the lawsuit. Riddle's request for termination of the lawsuit was denied. On July 13, 2021, it was reported Riddle's accuser dropped her lawsuit against him.

Travis Banks was accused of emotional abuse by former student Millie McKenzie, who had a relationship with Banks while aged 17. McKenzie also stated that Banks has had similar relationships with other trainees. Banks responded to the allegations via a statement. McKenzie proceeded to tweet screenshots of a text conversation between the two where Banks, who seemed to be intoxicated by the nature of his messages, had stalked McKenzie and was harassing her in a hotel room. Banks would be released by Progress Wrestling and WWE following the allegations and his profile was also deleted from WWE.com.

Ligero was accused of indecent assault, sending inappropriate messages, and engaging in inappropriate conduct. While he denied the indecent assault allegation, he admitted that he did send inappropriate messages and engaged in inappropriate conduct. Ligero would be released by Progress Wrestling and WWE following the allegations and his profile was also deleted from WWE.com.

Velveteen Dream was accused of having inappropriate communications with minors as well as attempting to groom them. He had previously been accused of sending inappropriate photos to minors several months earlier, which at that time he denied. Following Velveteen Dream's return on the August 12, 2020 episode of NXT, which was met with heavy criticism from fans, Triple H stated that WWE had investigated the allegations and they "didn't find anything". Following his release, Velveteen Dream issued a statement denying the allegations on May 24, 2021, and his profile was deleted from WWE.com.  

NXT UK referees Joel Allen and Chris Roberts were released by WWE on June 30 following allegations against them.

WWE released a statement concerning Devlin and Riddle saying they took the matters seriously and were looking into it. WWE would later issue a second statement saying that they would take action upon those who were arrested or convicted.

Various independent promotions
In March 2020, three months prior to the Speaking Out movement taking place, 3-2-1 Battle! cut ties with head booker/trainer Steve West following allegations made against him. The entire management team was forced to step down as well. An attempt to revive the promotion with a new management team was quickly abandoned.

Black Label Pro released wrestler Johnathan Wolf on June 19, following allegations of sexual assault and mental abuse. Game Changer Wrestling subsequently removed Wolf from their The Wrld on GCW Part 2 show on June 20.

Mikey Whiplash was accused of sexual harassment and physical abuse. Fierce Wrestling would cut ties with him following the allegations.

Inspire Pro Wrestling ended their relationship with wrestler Andy Dalton on June 20 following allegations that Dalton had sent inappropriate messages to a minor.

Following a string of sexual misconduct allegations made towards Singaporean wrestler Alex Cuevas, Singapore Pro Wrestling and Philippine Wrestling Revolution cut all ties with him.

On June 20, independent wrestler Kyle Boone tweeted about being assaulted and bullied by Kongo Kong at an independent wrestling event. Boone stated that he was forced to show his penis in front of the entire locker room and give him the money he made from the show and selling merch. Kong responded by saying when he started in the business, it was not uncommon to rib rookies. He continued his statement by saying if he had known sooner, he would have tried to hash it out like adults. He was not given any indication that something was wrong as it was all "hugs and smiles". He also stated he would only pick on people he liked and saw something in.

On June 21, Bar Wrestling was shut down following several multiple sexual assault allegations against owner Joey Ryan.

Progress Wrestling announced that the promotion underwent structural changes after several wrestlers were either suspended or fired due to the numerous allegations made against them. The promotion also announced that they would shut down until they were satisfied with the changes.

Former NWA/WCW and WWE manager Jim Cornette and his wife faced allegations from independent wrestler Phil Earley that he forced trainees to engage in sexual intercourse with her and would watch while he was in charge of Ohio Valley Wrestling. Cornette denied the allegations.

Saraya Knight retired on June 23 following allegations that she had abused both trainees and fellow colleagues.

Revolution Pro Wrestling fired trainer Andy Simmonz and one training student on June 24 following allegations against both.

Rockstar Pro Wrestling announced a new code of conduct in response to the Speaking Out movement.

Over the Top Wrestling announced that the promotion underwent staff and policy changes in response to the Speaking Out movement.

Westside Xtreme Wrestling cut ties with wrestlers Julian Pace and Jay Skillet after allegations were made against them.

Wrestling journalism
Michael Brandon Stroud, professional wrestling editor for Uproxx, had his "With Spandex" vertical suspended after he was accused of sexual assault. Uproxx later announced on July 2 that Stroud was fired from the publication and "With Spandex" would be shut down, with future pro wrestling coverage to appear on Uproxx Sports.

British Parliament inquiry
On September 24, 2020, the British Government launched a formal All-Party Parliamentary Group inquiry into the UK wrestling scene after the numerous allegations that came out of the Speaking Out movement. The inquiry will be headed by Alex Davies-Jones. Progress and Trust Wrestling announced they will be working with the APPG.

See also
 Believe women
 Me Too movement
 Hashtag activism
 Call-out culture

References

2020 controversies
2020 in professional wrestling
2020 introductions
2020 in Internet culture
21st-century social movements
Hashtags
Internet-based activism
Professional wrestling controversies
Sexual misconduct allegations
Violence against men
Violence against women